Staraya Taraba is a rural locality (a selo) in Kytmanovsky Selsoviet, Kytmanovsky District, Altai Krai, Russia. The population was 377 as of 2013. There are 5 streets.

Geography 
Staraya Taraba is located 8 km south of Kytmanovo (the district's administrative centre) by road, on the Taraba River. Ulus-Taraba and Kytmanovo are the nearest rural localities.

References 

Rural localities in Kytmanovsky District